Koromilia (before 1928: Σλίβενη - Sliveni) is a village in Kastoria Regional Unit, Macedonia, Greece.

It is famous in this region for its natural water springs. In the 19th century, Koromilia had an Albanian Muslim population. It was known as Sliveni among the Bulgarians of the surrounding villages.

The Greek census (1920) recorded 430 people in the village and in 1923 there were 460 inhabitants (or 60 families) who were Muslim. Following the Greek-Turkish population exchange, in 1926 within Sliveni there were refugee families from East Thrace (2), Asia Minor (5) and Pontus (74). The Greek census (1928) recorded 315 inhabitants. There were 80 refugee families (337 people) in 1928. 

The village of Sliveni, in 1920, was a pure Muslim Albanian village with 430 inhabitants.  In the official notebook number 156 of August 8, 1928, it is noted that there were sixty houses inhabited by 460 Muslim Albanians and 81 Greek families who came from Asia Minor, known as Pondios, after 1922. In 1928, the name of the village was also changed from Sliveni  in Koromila.

References

Populated places in Kastoria (regional unit)